Daniel Fernández Fernández (born 30 April 1997) is a Spanish professional footballer who plays as a right back for Racing de Santander.

Club career
Fernández was born in Madrid, and joined Real Madrid's La Fábrica in 2012, from CD Leganés. He made his senior debut with the reserves on 18 October 2015, starting in a 1–0 Segunda División B away win against CD Toledo.

On 5 August 2016, Fernández was loaned to fellow third division side Mérida AD. On 31 August 2017, he moved to CF Fuenlabrada in the same category, also in a temporary deal.

Fernández returned to Real Madrid in July 2018, being assigned to the B-team. On 24 July 2019, he returned to Fuenla after agreeing to a permanent one-year deal.

Fernández made his professional debut on 17 August 2019, coming on as a late substitute for José Fran in a 2–0 away defeat of Elche CF. On 10 August of the following year, after featuring sparingly, he signed for third division side CD Badajoz.

On 6 July 2022, Fernández moved to Segunda División side Racing de Santander on a two-year deal.

References

External links
Real Madrid profile

1997 births
Living people
Footballers from Madrid
Spanish footballers
Association football defenders
Segunda División players
Primera Federación players
Segunda División B players
Tercera División players
Real Madrid Castilla footballers
Mérida AD players
CF Fuenlabrada footballers
CD Badajoz players
Racing de Santander players